Plestiodon marginatus, the Ousima skink or Okinawa blue-tailed skink, is a species of lizard which is endemic to Japan.

References

marginatus
Reptiles of Japan
Reptiles described in 1861
Taxa named by Edward Hallowell (herpetologist)